Horom may refer to:
Horom, Armenia
Horom Citadel
Horom language